The 2021 Rugby World Cup was an international rugby union tournament held in New Zealand from 8 October until 12 November 2022. Twelve national teams competed, and each brought a 32-player squad containing no regulated number of players per-position to the tournament. The tournament was administered by World Rugby, to whom each team submitted their finalised squad.

The numbers of caps for each player do not include any matches played after the start of tournament.

Overview 
Below is a table listing all the head coaches and captains for each nation.

Pool A

Australia 
Australia named their final 32-player squad on 7 September 2022.

New Zealand 
New Zealand named their final 32-player squad on 13 September 2022.

Scotland 
Scotland named their final 32-player squad on 15 September 2022.

1On 17 October Choe Rollie left the squad through injury. No replacement was called up.

Wales 
Wales named their final 32-player squad on 21 September 2022.

1On 12 October Alisha Butchers was released from the squad following a knee injury sustained in Wales' match against Scotland. No replacement was initially called up.

2On 26 October Kate Williams was called up to the Wales squad.

Pool B

Canada 
Canada named their final 32-player squad on 31 August 2022.

1On 5 October Laura Russell was ruled out of the tournament through injury. She was replaced by Pamphinette Buisa.

2On 20 October Taylor Perry and Brianna Miller were both ruled out of the remainder of the tournament through injury. Veronica Harrigan joined the squad. 

Maya Montiel, Cindy Nelles, Abby Duguid, Janna Slevinsky, Renee Gonzalez and Chloe Daniels were selected as non-travelling reserves.

Italy 
Italy named their final 32-player squad on 21 September 2022.

Japan 
Japan named their final 32-player squad on 13 September 2022.

United States 
The United States named their final 32-player squad on 16 September 2022.

Alycia Washington, Rachel Ehrecke, Bulou Mataitoga and Saher Hamdan were named as non-travelling reserves.

Pool C

England 
England named their final 32-player squad on 20 September 2022.

1On 22 October Laura Keates withdrew from the squad due to injury. They were replaced by Detysha Harper.

Fiji 
Fiji named their final 32-player squad on 21 September 2022.

France 
France named their final 32-player squad on 11 September 2022

1On 17 October Laure Sansus withdrew from the squad through injury. She was replaced by Marie Dupouy.

South Africa 
South Africa named their final 32-player squad on 21 September 2022.

Statistics 
All statistics relate to the initial 32-man squads named prior to the start of the tournament on 8 October 2022 and do not include players who joined a squad during the tournament.

 Six squads included no players based outside their home country: Australia, New Zealand, England, France, Japan and South Africa
 The squads with the fewest players playing domestically are Wales (zero) and Scotland (nine)

Player representation by club 
The 384 participating players, 2 players unattached, represented 84 different club sides and 3 national sevens programs. The sides with the most players selected are below:

Players representation by league

Squad Caps

References 

2021
squads